The Catholic Church and the Holocaust, 1930–1965 is a book written by American historian Michael Phayer on the topic of Pope Pius XII and the Holocaust. It was published in 2000.

Preference for quiet diplomacy
Harvard professor Stanley Hoffmann considered it "a comprehensive and deeply disturbing volume" which "describes in detail Pope Pius XII's preference for quiet diplomacy with Hitler and his regime, his anxiety about the Catholic Church's fate, his solicitude for Germany's Catholics, and his conviction that communism posed a greater threat than did Nazism".

Helping Jews privately but not publicly
According to Robert A. Krieg, from the University of Notre Dame, this book is "an invaluable contribution to understanding the Catholic Church and the Holocaust." Phayer's main thesis, says Krieg, is that Pius XII privately helped Jews only to the extent that his efforts did not jeopardize two priorities in his foreign policy:

References

2000 non-fiction books
Books about Pope Pius XII
History books about the Holocaust
Pope Pius XII and the Holocaust